In consumer computer products, a beige box is a standard personal computer (PC). It has come to be used as a term of derision implying conservative or dated aesthetics and unremarkable specifications.

The term is ultimately derived from the style of many early personal computers and dedicated word processors, which were usually beige or similar colors like off white or ecru. These colors were presumably chosen to allow the machines to blend inconspicuously into a variety of settings, especially among similarly colored cubicles and office equipment.

IBM's early desktop computers (e.g. IBM Personal Computer, IBM PC/AT) were not only beige, but were distinctly box-shaped, and most manufacturers of clones followed suit. As IBM and its imitators came to dominate the industry, these features became unquestioned standards of desktop computer design. Some industrial design critics derided them as indistinguishable “beige boxes.”

The Commodore 64 (RAL 1019) or early Macintosh models (specifically Pantone 453) were a beige color. Although Apple switched to a desaturated gray they called “Platinum” in 1987, users began to refer to them as “beige” following the introduction of the brightly colored iMac and Blue and White G3. It then became a standard term to identify any previous OldWorld Macintosh, such as the “Beige G3.”

The term is also sometimes used to distinguish generic PCs from models made by "name brands" such as Compaq, Dell, or HP. In the early years of these companies, most of their units were beige as well.  More recently, as name-brand manufacturers have moved away from beige (typically switching to black, dark gray, and silver-colored cases), inexpensive generic cases became more distinct as "beige boxes". Today, the term "white box" has largely replaced this usage.

See also
 White box (computer hardware)

References

Personal computers
Computer enclosure